The Little River is a  river in the town of Georgetown, Maine. It flows directly into the Atlantic Ocean, between the mouth of the Sheepscot River to the east and the Kennebec River to the west. The lower portion of its course forms the western boundary of Reid State Park.

See also
List of rivers of Maine

References

Maine Streamflow Data from the USGS
Maine Watershed Data From Environmental Protection Agency

Rivers of Maine
Rivers of Sagadahoc County, Maine